Walter Bayley Madeley (Woolwich, England, 28 July 1873 – Boksburg, South Africa, 12 May 1947) was a leader of the South African Labour Party and a cabinet minister.

Madeley got his schooling in India at Bombay Cathedral High School. In 1889, he became an apprentice at the Woolwich Arsenal. In 1896 he immigrated to South Africa where he was a fitter in a mine on the Rand. He joined the Amalgamated Society of Engineers and took part in various strikes.  He was also the first vice-president of the Kimberley Trades Council, but was one of five of its leaders sacked by De Beers for their trade union activism.  This led him to start giving public speeches, in opposition to victimisation.  He relocated to the East Rand to find work, but was repeatedly victimised, and was compelled to start his own business in order to make a living.

Madeley was soon considered a leading figure in the Labour Party because of his exceptional ability. In the 1910 general election, he was first elected to the House of Assembly of South Africa as a Labour MP. He represented the districts of Springs (1910-1915), then Benoni (1915-1945).

General J.B.M. Hertzog's National Party formed a coalition government with Labour following the 1924 election in order to oust Jan Smuts's South African Party government. In November 1925, Madeley joined the cabinet as minister of post and telegraph services and public works. Even as minister, he advocated socialist policies such as nationalization of the means of production, to the embarrassment of his National Party colleagues.

In 1928 he received, against the express wishes of General Hertzog, a delegation of the Industrial and Commercial Workers' Union, an unrecognized union which had black members and grieved the working conditions of black employees in his department. Hertzog asked him to resign, but when he refused, Hertzog dropped him from the cabinet. This created a rift within the Labour Party whose leader, Frederic Creswell, supported Hertzog and remained in the government while Madeley's faction went in opposition and became known as "National Council Labour". The split continued until the 1933 election when Creswell's faction dissolved into Hertozg's National Party leaving Madeley to become undisputed leader of the Labour Party.

With the outbreak of World War II in 1939, the Labour Party voted against the Prime Minister Hertzog's motion of neutrality and supported General Smuts, whose party had entered into coalition with Hertzog in 1934 to form the United Party with Smuts as deputy prime minister. Hertzog was forced to resign and Smuts became prime minister for the duration of the war. Labour entered the wartime coalition government and Madeley served as Minister of Labour until the party left the coalition at the end of the war in 1945, he also served as minister of social affairs from 1939 to 1943. Madeley resigned as party leader in 1946 and died the next year.

References

Sources
 DJ Potgieter, Standard Encyclopaedia of Southern Africa, Cape Town: Nasionale Opvoedkundige Uitgewery (Nasou) 1972.
 BM Schoeman, Parlementêre verkiesings in Suid-Afrika 1910-1976, Pretoria: Aktuele Publikasies 1977
 Peter Alexander, Workers, War & the Origins of Apartheid: Labour and Politics in South Africa, 1939-1948, James Currey Publishers, 2000

1873 births
1947 deaths
Members of the House of Assembly (South Africa)
Government ministers of South Africa
South African people of English descent
South African trade unionists
Labour Party (South Africa) politicians
M
British people in colonial India
Emigrants from the United Kingdom to Cape Colony